Shortridge Academy is a year-round residential secondary school in Milton, New Hampshire which employs the positive youth development model. It is a coeducational therapeutic school for teenagers.

References

Private high schools in New Hampshire
Boarding schools in New Hampshire
Therapeutic community
Schools in Strafford County, New Hampshire
Therapeutic boarding schools in the United States
Milton, New Hampshire